Paulo Sérgio Nogueira de Oliveira (born 28 September 1958, in Iguatu) is a Brazilian Army general who served as minister of defence of Brazil.

Military career
From the Military School of Fortaleza, he started his military career on 4 March 1974, at the Brazilian Army Preparatory School for Cadets (EsPCEx), moving in 1977 to the Agulhas Negras Military Academy, where he was promoted to aspirant on 15 December 1980.

During his military life, Nogueira was instructor at the Agulhas Negras Military Academy in three opportunities, being, in one of the them, Commander of the Infantry Class.

In 1994, he was Sub-Commander of the 2nd Battalion of Jungle Infantry, in Belém. He was also Staff Official of the 12th Military Region, in Manaus. Commander the 10th Battalion of Light Infantry-Mountain, in Juiz de Fora. Nogueira was head of the 5th Section of Command of the 10th Military Region, in Fortaleza.

Also, as Colonel, he was attache of the Brazilian Army and Air Force Naval Defence in Mexico, Head of the Section of Official Promotions and Sub-Director of the Board of Evaluations and Promotions.

Military awards
  Order of Military Merit (Grand Cross)
  Order of Naval Merit (Grand Officer)
  Order of Aeronautical Merit (Grand Officer)
  Order of Military Justice Merit
  Medal of the Peacemaker
  Medal of Victory
  Santos-Dumont Merit Medal

References

|-

|-

1958 births
Living people
Brazilian generals
Defence ministers of Brazil